Yashalta (Yaşalta) is a rural locality (a selo) and the administrative center of Yashaltinsky District of the Republic of Kalmykia, Russia. Population:

History 
It was established in 1877 by Estonians and was originally called Esto-Khaginskoye (Эсто-Хагинское).

References

Notes

Sources

Rural localities in Kalmykia
Yashaltinsky District